Metasia phragmatias is a moth in the family Crambidae. It was described by Oswald Bertram Lower in 1903. It is found in Australia, where it has been recorded from Queensland.

The wingspan is about 14 mm. The forewings are whitish ochreous with fuscous markings and some fuscous suffusion at the base. The hindwings have the same colour as the forewings.

References

Moths described in 1903
Metasia